Marien Ngouabi University (French: Université Marien Ngouabi, UMNG) is the only state-funded university in the Republic of Congo. It is located in the capital of Brazzaville.

History
The University of Brazzaville was founded on 4 December 1971 amidst desires to assert the country's sovereignty. Following the assassination of President Marien Ngouabi on 18 March 1977, the university was renamed in his honor on 28 July 1977. The University of Brazzaville was a continuation of the Foundation for Higher Education in Central Africa (1961), which in turn developed out of the Center for Higher Education in Brazzaville (1959). It has a number of separate campuses, each with individual libraries (ten different ones in 1993), in Brazzaville and the rest of the country. The largest and most important library is what is called the Central Library, the Library of the School of Humanities and of the Advanced Institute of Economic, Juridical, Administrative, and Management Sciences (1993 nomenclature); this library originates in the library of French Equatorial Africa's government and the Alliance Française.

Initially, the university had four institutions and 3,000 students; by 2012 it had grown to 11 institutions and some 20,000 students.

Institutions
(:
Faculty of Law
Faculty of Economic Sciences
Faculty of Letters and Human Sciences
Faculty of Sciences
Faculty of Health Sciences
Superior Institute of Management
Institute of Rural Development
Superior Institute of Physical and Sports Education
National School of Administration and the Magistracy
National School of Advanced Studies
National Polytechnic School

Alumni
 Edith Bongo (1964–2009), physician and former First Lady of Gabon
 Delphine Djiraibe (1960–), lawyer and human rights activist
 Mandingha Kosso Moanda, academic

References

External links
 Official Web Site 

Universities in the Republic of the Congo
Organisations based in Brazzaville
Educational institutions established in 1971
1971 establishments in the Republic of the Congo